GreenWheel EV， full name Shenzhen Greenwheel Electric Vehicle Group Co.,Ltd （深圳市陆地方舟新能源电动车集团有限公司）is a Chinese automobile manufacturer headquartered in Guangdong, China, that specializes in developing electric buses and low-speed electric vehicle or Neighborhood Electric Vehicles.

History

GreenWheel EV was founded in January 2000 and is based in Guangdong, China. They started out making neighborhood electric vehicles. In May 2017, they got a permit to start selling and building highway legal vehicles. They built a 50,000 unit plant in Mingcheng Industrial Park, which costed $267 million. GreenWheel EV built a mini city called EV Valley. It includes their factory, research factory, parts integration center, a conference center, education and training center, vehicle theme park, race track, new energy museum, hotel, and electric vehicle demonstration center.

Their first vehicle was the J0 small hatchback. It was based on the Renault Zoe. It was shown in 2012, but failed to make production.

The company's second vehicle was the V5, an electric crossover. It uses a 16 kWh battery and has 47 horsepower. Its dimensions are 4045 mm/1737 mm/1643 mm, a wheelbase of 2500 mm, and a weight of 1,380 kg.

The GreenWheel EV Jummer, also called the Jimma, convertible was first shown in 2010. It was not street legal, and was mainly on golf courts. It was remade in 2014 at the China Hi-Tech Fair in Shenzhen. It was made into a Cabriolet in 2011 and a Hard Top in 2013. Its dimensions measure 3660 mm/1600 mm/1700 mm, and has a wheelbase of 2335 mm.

The JEV is a compact hatchback with 5 doors and 4 seats. Its dimensions are 4631 mm/1789 mm/1470 mm. It comes in a Basic Type, Comfortable Type, and Luxurious Type. The JEV has a 18.5 kW lead-acid battery.

Vehicles

Current models
GreenWheel EV currently has 3 production vehicles.

Commercial Use
GreenWheel EV has 5 public-use commercial vehicles.

Private Use
GreenWheel EV RQ6700XQQ40
GreenWheel EV RQ6100GNH5P0
GreenWheel EV RQ6810GCH4P0
GreenWheel EV RQ6100GCH4P0
GreenWheel EV RQ6120GNH5P0
GreenWheel EV RQ6900GNH5P0
GreenWheel EV RQ6850GNH5P0
GreenWheel EV RQ6700XCQ4P0
GreenWheel EV RQ6120GHEVH5P0
GreenWheel EV RQ6100GPHEVH4
GreenWheel EV RQ5060XXYCQ40
GreenWheel EV RQ5060XQCI-DA
GreenWheel EV RQ5020ZXXQQ40
GreenWheel EV RQ5020CTYBEV0
GreenWheel EV RQ6110YEVH1
GreenWheel EV RQ6830YEVH11 
GreenWheel EV RQ6600XEVQA
GreenWheel EV RQ6830YEVH10
GreenWheel EV RQ6830YEVH9
GreenWheel EV RQ6830YEVH13
GreenWheel EV RQ6830YEVH12
GreenWheel EV RQ6830YEVH8
GreenWheel EV RQ6830GEVH3
GreenWheel EV RQ6830GEVH2
GreenWheel EV RQ6830GEVH1
GreenWheel EV RQ6101GEVH1
GreenWheel EV RQ6120GEVH8
GreenWheel EV RQ6120GEVH9
GreenWheel EV RQ6101GEVH0
GreenWheel EV RQ6101GEVH2
GreenWheel EV RQ5041XXYEVZ0
GreenWheel EV RQ5041XXYEVZ2
GreenWheel EV RQ5041XXYEVZ1
GreenWheel EV RQ5022XXYEVZ3
GreenWheel EV RQ5026XXYEVH0
GreenWheel EV RQ5022XXYEVH9
GreenWheel EV RQ5022XXYEVHE
GreenWheel EV RQ5022XXYEVHD

Awards
"The Best Green Controlling Prize" 
"The Best Space Award"
"Qinghai Lake International Electric Car Challenge"
"Shenzhen Major Project"
"China funding support project"
"Guangdong enterprise workstation for academician and expert"
"Guangdong strategic emerging industry base"
"Jiangsu new energy vehicle industry base"
"Jiangsu workstation of business graduate student"
"Innovative Enterprises"
"Excellent Technology Achievements Transformation Projects"
"Excellent Products"
"Excellent enterprise for productivity"
"2011 Shenzhen innovation enterprise of the culture construction"
"2011 Shenzhen meritorious enterprise of the culture construction"
"Boao prize, 2012 industry demonstration unit"
"Guangdong excellent independent brand"
"Chinese famous brand"
"Asia famous brand"
"2001 brand spectrum gold award"
"The consistent quality brand"
"The annual top ten innovative bus company"
"The best energy saving prize of 2014 Qinghai lake international electric car challenge"

See also

ChangJiang
Dial EV
EV Valley

References

Electric vehicle manufacturers of China
Car brands
Car manufacturers of China
Chinese brands